was a Japanese domain of the Edo period.  It is associated with Bungo Province in present-day Ōita Prefecture on the island of Kyushu.

In the han system, Funai was a political and economic abstraction based on periodic cadastral surveys and projected agricultural yields.  In other words, the domain was defined in terms of kokudaka, not land area. This was different from the feudalism of the West.

History
Funai had been the castle of the Ōtomo clan; however, Toyotomi Hideyoshi confiscated it during the lordship of Ōtomo Yoshimune. In 1601, Takenaka Shigetoshi, the cousin of Takenaka Shigeharu (Hanbei), received Funai Castle, and land rated at 20,000 koku; he had switched sides during the Sekigahara Campaign to support Tokugawa Ieyasu. The domain was then given to Hineno Yoshiakira in 1634; however, as he died heirless, the domain was given to the Matsudaira (Ogyū) clan. The Matsudaira clan remained daimyōs of Funai until the Meiji Restoration.

List of daimyōs 
The hereditary daimyōs were head of the clan and head of the domain.

Takenaka clan, 1601–1634 (tozama; 20,000 koku)

Shigetoshi (cousin of Takenaka Hanbei)
Shigeyoshi

Hineno clan, 1634–1656 (tozama; 20,000 koku)

Yoshiakira

Matsudaira (Ogyū) clan, 1656–1871 (Fudai; 21,000 koku)

Tadaaki
Chikanobu
Chikayoshi
Chikasada
Chikanori
Chikatomo
Chikayoshi
Chikakuni
Chikanobu
Chikayoshi

See also 
 List of Han
 Abolition of the han system

References

External links
 Funai Domain on "Edo 300 HTML"  (16 Sept. 2007)
 Pictures of the remains of Funai Castle

Domains of Japan
Ogyū-Matsudaira clan